Callis is a surname. Notable people with the surname include:

Ann Callis (born 1964), American judge
Charles A. Callis (1865–1947), American Mormon leader
Don Callis (born 1963), Canadian wrestler
Henry Arthur Callis (1887–1974), American physician and fraternity co-founder
James Callis (born 1971), British actor
Jim Callis (born 1967), American sportswriter
Jo Callis (born 1951), British musician and songwriter
Jo Ann Callis (born 1940), American artist
John Callis (died 1576), Welsh pirate
John Benton Callis (1828–1898), American businessman
Paul Callis (born 1978), British swimmer
Sam Callis (born 1973), British actor and director
Tracy Callis, American sportswriter
William Overton Callis (1756–1814), American politician